Elbe-Parey is a municipality in the Jerichower Land district, in Saxony-Anhalt, Germany. It is situated on the Elbe-Havel Canal, approx. 40 km northeast of Magdeburg. It was established in September 2001 by the merger of the seven former municipalities Bergzow, Derben, Ferchland, Güsen, Hohenseeden, Parey and Zerben.

Zerben was the birthplace (1853) of Elisabeth von Ardenne, on whose life the novel "Effi Briest" is considered to be based.

References

Jerichower Land